A boatswain, bo's'n, bos'n, or bosun, also known as a deck boss, or a qualified member of the deck department, is the most senior rate of the deck department and is responsible for the components of a ship's hull. The boatswain supervises the other members of the ship's deck department, and typically is not a watchstander, except on vessels with small crews. Additional duties vary depending upon ship, crew, and circumstances.

History

The word boatswain has been in the English language since approximately 1450. It is derived from late Old English batswegen, from bat (boat) concatenated with Old Norse sveinn (swain), meaning a young man, apprentice, a follower, retainer or servant. Directly translated to modern Norwegian it would be båtsvenn, while the actual crew title in Norwegian is båtsmann ("boats-man").  While the phonetic spelling bosun is reported as having been observed since 1868, this latter spelling was used in Shakespeare's The Tempest written in 1611, and as bos'n in later editions.

Royal Navy
The rank of boatswain is the oldest rank in the Royal Navy, and its origins can be traced back to the year 1040. In that year, when five English ports began furnishing warships to King Edward the Confessor in exchange for certain privileges, they also furnished crews whose officers were the master, boatswain, carpenter, and cook. Later these officers were warranted by the British Admiralty. They maintained and sailed the ships and were the standing officers of the navy. The boatswain was the officer responsible for the care of the rigging, cordage, anchors, sails, boats, flags and other stores.

The Royal Navy's last official boatswain, Commander E.W. Andrew OBE, retired in 1990. However, most RN vessels still have a Chief Boatswain's Mate (or "Buffer"), who is the most senior rating in the Seaman Specialist department.

Naval cadets
The rank of cadet boatswain, in some schools, is the second highest rank in the combined cadet force naval section that a cadet can attain, below the rank of coxswain and above the rank of leading hand. It is equivalent to the rank of colour sergeant in the army and the royal marines cadets; it is sometimes an appointment for a senior petty officer to assist a coxswain.

Job description

The boatswain works in a ship's deck department as the foreman of the unlicensed (crew members without a mate's licence) deck crew.  Sometimes, the boatswain is also a third or fourth mate. A boatswain must be highly skilled in all matters of marlinespike seamanship required for working on deck of a seagoing vessel. The boatswain is distinguished from other able seamen by the supervisory roles: planning, scheduling, and assigning work.

As deck crew foreman, the boatswain plans the day's work and assigns tasks to the deck crew. As work is completed, the boatswain checks on completed work for compliance with approved operating procedures.

Outside the supervisory role, the boatswain regularly inspects the vessel and performs a variety of routine, skilled, and semi-skilled duties to maintain all areas of the ship not maintained by the engine department. These duties can include cleaning, painting, and maintaining the vessel's hull, superstructure and deck equipment as well as executing a formal preventive maintenance program.

A boatswain's skills may include cargo rigging, winch operations, deck maintenance, working aloft, and other duties required during deck operations. The boatswain is well versed in the care and handling of lines, and has knowledge of knots, hitches, bends, whipping, and splices as needed to perform tasks such as mooring a vessel. The boatswain typically operates the ship's windlasses when letting go and heaving up anchors.  Moreover, a boatswain may be called upon to lead firefighting efforts or other emergency procedures encountered on board.  Effective boatswains are able to integrate their seafarer skills into supervising and communicating with members of deck crew with often diverse backgrounds.

Originally, on board sailing ships the boatswain was in charge of a ship's anchors, cordage, colours, deck crew and the ship's boats. The boatswain would also be in charge of the rigging while the ship was in dock. The boatswain's technical tasks were modernised with the advent of steam engines and subsequent mechanisation.

A boatswain also is responsible for doing routine pipes using what is called a boatswain's call. There are specific sounds which can be made with the pipe to indicate various events, such as emergency situations or notifications of meal time.

Notable boatswains

A number of boatswains and naval boatswains mates have achieved fame. Reuben James and William Wiley are famous for their heroism in the Barbary Wars and are namesakes of the ships USS Reuben James and USS Wiley.  Medal of Honor recipients Francis P. Hammerberg and George Robert Cholister were U.S. Navy boatswain's mates, as was Navy Cross recipient Stephen Bass.  Victoria Cross recipients John Sheppard, John Sullivan, Henry Curtis, and John Harrison were Royal Navy boatswain's mates.

During World War II Bosun John Crisp RN is credited in "The Colditz Story" by escapee Pat Reid as providing, whilst a prisoner of war at Oflag IV-C, Colditz Castle, the expertise and enthusiasm to manufacture torn and then woven "bedsheet ropes", tested for appropriate strength, using his extensive maritime experience.

There are also a handful of boatswains and boatswain's mates in literature. The boatswain in William Shakespeare's The Tempest is a central character in the opening scene, which takes place aboard a ship at sea, and appears again briefly in the final scene. Typhoon by Joseph Conrad has a nameless boatswain who tells Captain MacWhirr of a "lump" of men going overboard during the peak of the storm.  Also, the character Bill Bobstay in Gilbert and Sullivan's musical comedy H.M.S. Pinafore is alternatively referred to as a "bos'un" and a "boatswain's mate". Another boatswain from literature is Smee from Peter Pan. Lord Byron had a Newfoundland dog named Boatswain. Byron wrote the famous poem "Epitaph to a Dog" and had a monument made for him at Newstead Abbey. The 1907 naval gothic novel The Boats of the "Glen Carrig" by William Hope Hodgson features the character of the ship's “bo'sun” as an important member of the crew and a personal friend to the narrator.

Billy Bones was a boatswain in the fictional Starz TV show Black Sails.

Scouting
Quartermaster is the highest rank in the Sea Scouts, BSA, an older youth (13–21) co-ed programme. The youth can also elect a youth leader, giving that youth the title "boatswain". In the Netherlands, a boatswain (Bootsman) is the patrol leader of a Sea Scout patrol (Bak); in Flanders, it is the assistant patrol leader of a Sea Scout patrol (Kwartier).

See also

Boatswain's mate (United States Coast Guard)
Boatswain's mate (United States Navy)
Bootsmann
Bosun's chair
Buffer (navy)
Deck department
Merchant Navy (United Kingdom)
Seafarer's professions and ranks
Serang (disambiguation)
Ship transport
United States Merchant Marine

Notes
This article incorporates text from public-domain sources, including websites. For specific sources of text, see notes.

References

External links
 
 
CorPun website on corporal punishments
Boatswain at OccupationalInfo.org

Marine occupations
Nautical terminology
Titles
Naval ranks